Llynfi power station supplied electricity to the Bridgend area of Glamorgan South Wales from 1943 to 1977. The coal-fired station was originally built and operated by the South Wales Power Company Limited to supply electricity to munitions factories during the Second World War. It was completed by the post-nationalisation British Electricity Authority in 1951, and was later operated by the Central Electricity Generating Board. The power station was closed in 1977 and was subsequently demolished. There have been several proposals to redevelop the site.

History
Llanfi power station was built during the Second World War by the South Wales Power Company Limited. It was one of several power station built at this time, such as Birmingham Corporation’s Hams Hall B station, which the Electricity Commissioners and the Central Electricity Board were able to demonstrate were required to supply electricity to munitions factories.

The South Wales Company also owned and operated Upper Boat power station.

Llynfi power station (51°34'13"N 3°36'40"W) was built north of Bridgend adjacent to the Afon Llynfi and the Bridgend to Maesteg railway line which facilitated access to cooling water for the condensers and coal supplies for the boilers.

Equipment specification
The plant at Llynfi power station comprised:

 4 × 300,000 lb/h (37.8 kg/s) Stirling boilers, working pressure 675 psi at 910 °F (46.6 bar at 488 °C). These were supplied with pulverised coal fuel produced for each boiler by 3 × 7.35 tons/h Babcock and Wilcox E44 mills. 
 Coal was supplied to the station via dedicated sidings connected to the Bridgend to Maesteg railway.
 4 × 30 MW English Electric turbo-alternators, generating current at 11 kV.
 Step-up transformers raised the voltage to 66 kV for local distribution.
 Two cooling towers. One film reinforced concrete tower with a capacity of 2.5 million gallons per hour (3.16 m3/s). One film reinforced concrete tower with a capacity of 3.0 million gallons per hour (3.79 m3/s). The cooling tower built during the war was painted with camouflage.

Evaporative water losses from the cooling towers was made-up with water from the adjacent Afon Llynfi.

The generating sets were commissioned over several years: the first set in December 1943, the second in April 1944, the third in January 1951, and the final set in November 1951.

Operations
Upon nationalisation of the British electricity supply industry in 1948 under the provisions of the Electricity Act 1947 (10-11 Geo. 6 c. 54)  the South Wales Power Company Limited electricity undertaking was abolished, ownership of Llynfi power station was vested in the British Electricity Authority, and subsequently the Central Electricity Authority and the Central Electricity Generating Board (CEGB). At the same time the electricity distribution and sales responsibilities of the electricity undertaking were transferred to the South Wales Electricity Board (SWALEC).

Operating data
Operating data for the period 1946–72 is shown in the table:

Electricity output (GWh) from Llynfi power station.
With a high thermal efficiency when it was new the station was used intensively during the 1950, with a load factor running hours approaching 100 per cent. It was used less intensively in the 1960s and 1970s.

Closure and proposals
Llynfi power station was decommissioned on 31 March 1977.

There was a proposal in 1977 to use the power station to burn domestic and trade waste to generate electricity. The station would need to burn 460,000 tons per year of waste to make the scheme viable. The proposal was not taken forward. The plant and equipment was removed from the station soon after closure. The buildings were left although the cooling towers were demolished.

In 2011 there was a proposal to burn biomass at the station. The biomass would be imported into Newport docks and the former railway sidings at Llynfi would be reinstated. Planning permission was granted by Bridgend County Borough Council but the plans were not developed.

A further proposal to build a waste combustion plant was put forward in 2019. There were local concerns about increased traffic.

See also
 Timeline of the UK electricity supply industry
 List of power stations in Wales

References

Demolished power stations in the United Kingdom
Former power stations in Wales